Ardakan County is in Yazd province, Iran. The capital of the county is the city of Ardakan. At the 2006 census, the county's population was 66,900 in 18,140 households. The following census in 2011 counted 77,758 people in 21,186 households. At the 2016 census, the county's population was 97,960 in 28,216 households.

Administrative divisions

The population history of Ardakan County's administrative divisions over three consecutive censuses is shown in the following table. The latest census shows three districts, five rural districts, and three cities.

Notable people
Mohammad Khatami (Former president of Iran) was born in Ardakan.

References

 

Counties of Yazd Province